Kilmeedy is a village in County Limerick, in the parish of Feenagh-Kilmeedy.

In Irish, Kilmeedy translates as Cill m'Íde, or Church of my Ita. This refers to Saint Ita who founded a church in the area before moving to another parish in the Limerick area, Killeedy, also named after the saint. Kilmeedy was a medieval settlement, and Feenagh/Kilmeedy became a parish in 1851.

Kilmeedy village is located on the R519 from Ballingarry to Dromcolliher at a crossroads. Five roads radiate from the village. The population of the parish is about 900. According to 1911 Census records for Kilmeedy, the population of the village alone at the time was 274.

There is one supposed holy well in Kilmeedy's surrounding townlands called St. Brigid's Well.
A little to the north of the village there is situated a mass rock which was used as a site for illegal Catholic mass services during the time of the Penal Laws.  It is still used for outdoor masses to this day on some ceremonial occasions.

The village hosts an annual vintage rally towards the later Summer months showcasing many vintage vehicles and many old fashioned trades.

The local GAA club is that of Feenagh-Kilmeedy and the club have one Limerick Senior Hurling Club Championship title, won in 1963. However the parish has been the home of many fine hurlers and indeed Rugby players and has a long sporting history.

In recent years the village has pursued many avenues to record and represent its history and community for others to see and has a strong and active community organization.

See also
 List of towns and villages in Ireland

References

External links
 Diocesan Heritage Project, Feenagh-Kilmeedy Parish

Towns and villages in County Limerick
Articles on towns and villages in Ireland possibly missing Irish place names